William Graham Claytor Jr. (March 14, 1912 – May 14, 1994) was an American attorney, United States Navy officer, and railroad, transportation and defense administrator for the United States government, working under the administrations of three US presidents.

He is remembered for his actions as the commanding officer of the destroyer escort  during World War II, which helped to save 316 lives during the  tragedy. Over 30 years later, Claytor's moderate actions on behalf of the rights of female and gay service personnel as Secretary of the Navy were considered progressive for the time. He is also credited with a distinguished transportation career, including ten years as president of the Southern Railway and 11 years as the head of Amtrak, guiding the passenger railroad through a particularly difficult period in its history. He was named the Virginian of the Year in 1977.

Early life and career

Claytor was born in Roanoke, Virginia on March 14, 1912, and grew up in both Virginia and Philadelphia. He was the son of Gertrude Harris Boatwright Claytor, a lyric poet, and W. Graham Claytor (1886–1971), who was vice-president of Appalachian Power.

Claytor graduated from the University of Virginia in Charlottesville, Virginia in 1933. He then graduated from Harvard Law School summa cum laude in 1936. He then clerked for Learned Hand, Judge of the U.S. Court of Appeals for the Second Circuit. He then moved to Washington, D.C., to become law clerk to U.S. Supreme Court Associate Justice Louis Brandeis before joining the prestigious Washington law firm Covington and Burling.

Career

World War II — USS Indianapolis tragedy

In 1940, soon after the start of World War II, 28-year-old Claytor attempted to enlist, but was initially rejected by the United States Navy as being too old. He finally joined under a special provision, based upon his previous experience in sports boating. He was assigned to the Pacific Theater.

Late in the war, Claytor became commanding officer of the destroyer escort  on patrol in the Pacific Ocean. In August 1945, Claytor sped without orders  to investigate reports of men floating in the water. As Cecil J. Doyle approached the area at night, Claytor turned the ship's searchlights on the water and straight up on low clouds, lighting up the night, despite the risk of exposing his ship to possible attack by Japanese submarines. These actions facilitated the rescue of the survivors of the sunken cruiser .

Indianapolis had been on a secret mission and, due to a communications error, had not been reported as overdue (or missing). An estimated 900 men survived the sinking, but spent days floating in life jackets trying to fight off sharks. While only 316 were rescued out of a crew of 1199 who were aboard Indianapolis, Claytor's actions were widely credited by survivors with preventing an even greater loss of life.

Legal practice and Southern Railway

After World War II, he resumed practice of law in Washington, D.C. He became an officer of the Southern Railway in 1963, serving as president from 1967 to 1977. Notwithstanding his legal background, Claytor was known as an "operations" man, often riding the company's trains, monitoring and questioning performance. In contrast to his predecessor, D. William Brosnan, Claytor was an "employee's President," often chatting with the crews of the trains on which he rode, actively soliciting their suggestions on how to make the railroad run better. He carried this attitude with him during his later service as the President of Amtrak.

U.S. Government service

Claytor served as the Secretary of the Navy under President Jimmy Carter from 1977 to 1979. He is credited with leading the United States Navy into its first recognition of women's right to serve on ships and of rights of gays to leave the service without criminal records.  His positions were considered by activists to be progressive for the time, leading to further progress years later in these controversial issues.

In 1979, he was appointed to the position of Deputy Secretary of Defense. General Colin Powell served as his military assistant.

In the summer of 1979, he took a brief leave from the Defense Department to serve as Acting Secretary of Transportation in President Carter's Cabinet. His service at the Transportation Department bridged the tenures of Secretary Brock Adams and Secretary Neil Goldschmidt.

Amtrak

In 1982, Claytor came out of retirement to lead Amtrak. He was recruited and strongly supported by John H. Riley, an attorney who was also the head of the Federal Railroad Administration (FRA) under the Reagan Administration from 1983 to 1989.

Claytor maintained a good relationship with the U.S. Congress during his 11 years in the position. Within 7 years of being under Claytor's leadership, Amtrak was generating enough money to cover 72 percent of its $1.7 billion operating budget by 1989, up from 48 percent in 1981. This was achieved mainly through vigorous cost-cutting and aggressive marketing. He is credited with bringing political and operational stability to the nation's passenger train network, keeping the railroad functioning properly despite repeated attempts by the administrations of Ronald Reagan and his successor George H. W. Bush to eliminate its funding.

Claytor retired from Amtrak in 1993.

Legacy and heritage
Claytor was named the Virginian of the Year in 1977. In 1989, he was named Railroader of the Year by Railway Age magazine.

He was the brother of Robert B. Claytor, who became president of Norfolk and Western Railway in 1981 and was the first chairman and CEO of Norfolk Southern after it was formed by merger with the Southern Railway System in 1982.  Robert B. Claytor is best remembered by many railfans for reactivating Norfolk and Western Railway's steam program, which rebuilt steam locomotives Class J611 and Class A 1218 at the Roanoke Shops at Roanoke, Virginia, and operated excursion trips. Claytor Jr. would occasionally take the throttle as engineer with his brother on the steam excursions.

Claytor died on May 14, 1994.

At Amtrak's Washington, DC Union Station a passenger concourse was renamed "Claytor Concourse" in his honor.

"The Claytor Brothers: Virginians Building America's Railroad" is a semi-permanent exhibit at the Virginia Museum of Transportation in Roanoke, Virginia.

See also 
 List of law clerks of the Supreme Court of the United States (Seat 4)
 List of railroad executives

References

 

 quotes from article by journalist Don Phillips of the Washington Post in a "Tribute to W. Graham Claytor Jr." published May, 1994
 Survivors Groups official website for the U.S.S. Indianapolis

External links
 

1912 births
1994 deaths
20th-century American railroad executives
Politicians from Roanoke, Virginia
Military personnel from Virginia
United States Navy officers
United States Navy personnel of World War II
United States Secretaries of the Navy
United States Deputy Secretaries of Defense
Amtrak presidents
University of Virginia alumni
Harvard Law School alumni
Law clerks of Judge Learned Hand
Law clerks of the Supreme Court of the United States
Southern Railway (U.S.)
American railroaders
People associated with Covington & Burling